Yu Yang (born 21 September 1983) is a former Chinese professional footballer.

Arrest
In 2010, Yu was arrested for alleged bribery over match-fixing allegations.

Career statistics

Club

Notes

References

Living people
1983 births
Chinese footballers
Association football defenders
Hong Kong First Division League players
Hong Kong Premier League players
Zhejiang Professional F.C. players
Hong Kong Rangers FC players
Metro Gallery FC players
Happy Valley AA players